is a railway station on the Tobu Tojo Line in Toshima, Tokyo, Japan, operated by the private railway operator Tobu Railway. Despite its name, the station is not actually located in Itabashi, Tokyo.

Lines
Only "Local" (all-stations) services stop at this station, with eight trains per hour in each direction during the daytime.

Station layout

The station consists of two side platforms serving two tracks. The main (north) entrance leads directly onto the up (Ikebukuro-bound) platform 2, with passenger access to the down platform 1 via an underground passage. An additional entrance (south entrance) is open during the morning and evening peak hours. Toilet facilities are provided on platform 2.

Platforms

History

The station opened on 1 May 1914. At the time of its opening, the station was located in the town of Itabashi (later becoming Itabashi Ward), and took its name from the neighbourhood of Shimo-Itabashi adjacent to the station. The station was relocated in 1935, moving it across the boundary from Itabashi into Toshima. The site of the original station is now used as a stabling yard with capacity for up to eight trains, and the "0.0" kilometre post for the Tobu Tojo Line is located here.

From 17 March 2012, station numbering was introduced on the Tobu Tojo Line, with Shimo-Itabashi Station becoming "TJ-03".

Passenger statistics
In fiscal 2010, the station was used by an average of 14,986 passengers daily.

Surrounding area
 Itabashi Station (JR Saikyo Line, 10 minutes' walk)
 Shin-Itabashi Station ( Toei Mita Line, 15 minutes' walk)

See also
 List of railway stations in Japan

References

External links

Shimo-Itabashi Station information 

Tobu Tojo Main Line
Stations of Tobu Railway
Railway stations in Tokyo
Railway stations in Japan opened in 1914